Radiation Effects in Insulators (REI) is a long-running international conference series
dedicated to basic and applied scientific research relating to radiation effects in insulators and non-metallic materials. It is held every second year in locations around the world.

The REI conference has a long history. Since the first conference was held in 1981, REI has been the international forum to present and discuss the latest achievements in the field of insulating materials modification through different kind of radiation (ions, electrons, neutrons, etc). The conference regularly attracts about 200 attendees.

Topics covered 

The REI conference covers a wide range of topics including the following.

Atomistic and Collective Processes of Radiation Effects 

 Fundamental knowledge on atomistic and electronic defect production and stability
 Irradiation-induced microstructural evolution and material modifications
 Fundamentals, theory and computer simulations
 Advances in defect and material characterization
 Radiation response of nanomaterials
 Swift heavy ion irradiations
 Neutron irradiations
 Laser-solid interactions
 Electron-solid interactions

Irradiated Materials 

 Simple and complex oxides
 Carbides and nitrides
 Polymers
 Ionic crystals
 Semiconductor and scintillator materials
 Glasses and silica
 Carbon-based materials
 Nanocomposites and nanostructured materials

Applications 

 Nuclear materials: fission, fusion and waste forms
 Functional nanocomposites
 Photonic, bio-medicine and sensing materials
 Micro- and nano-patterning
 Materials processing with swift heavy ions and cluster beams

Proceedings 

The proceedings of REI-1 (1981) and REI-3 (1985) were published in the peer-reviewed journal Radiation Effects, renamed Radiation Effects and Defects in Solids in 1989. The proceedings of REI-1 are found in volume 64 [issues 1-4] and volume 65 [issues 1-4] of this journal. The proceedings of REI-3 are found in volume 97 [issues 3-4], volume 98 [issues 1-4], and volume 99 [issues 1-4] of this journal.

The proceedings of REI-2 (1983) and every REI conference since REI-4 (1987) have been published in the peer-reviewed Elsevier journal Nuclear Instruments and Methods in Physics Research B. These REI proceedings can be found in the following volumes of this journal: REI-2 (vol. 1), REI-4 (vol. 32), REI-5 (vol. 46), REI-6 (vol. 65), REI-7 (vol. 91), REI-8 (vol. 116), REI-9 (vol.141), REI-10 (vol. 166-167), REI-11 (vol. 191), REI-12 (vol. 218), REI-13 (vol. 250), REI-14 (vol. 266), REI-15 (vol. 268), and REI-16 (vol. 286).

REI conferences held 

The complete list of REI conferences held up to 2013 is as follows.
The chairmen for the conferences prior to 2009 are taken 
from the list of proceedings editors in

References 

Physics conferences
Radiation effects